Toko Kompak is a historic landmark in Pasar Baru, Jakarta, Indonesia. It was the residence of Tio Tek Ho, Majoor der Chinezen (1896-1908), who was the penultimate head of the Chinese community in colonial Jakarta.

The building was probably built in the first half of the nineteenth century in a combination of Chinese, European and native Indonesian styles of architecture. At some point in the late colonial era, the residence was leased out and converted into a commercial store, called Sin Siong Bouw. After Independence in 1945, the name of the store was changed to Kompak.

References

Central Jakarta
Colonial architecture in Jakarta
Dutch colonial architecture
Buildings and structures in Jakarta
Tio family of Pasar Baroe